Craig William Macneill is an American film director, writer, and editor.  His feature film Lizzie, starring Chloë Sevigny and Kristen Stewart, premiered in the U.S Dramatic Competition section at the 2018 Sundance Film Festival. The film was acquired by Roadside Attractions and Saban Films  and released theatrically in the fall of 2018. Macneill's first feature film, The Boy, premiered in the narrative competition at the 2015 SXSW Film Festival and which was also based on a previous short film he co-wrote, directed, and edited titled Henley, which screened in competition at the 2012 Sundance Film Festival and won the grand jury prize for "Best Short Film" at the Gen Art Film Festival and Clint Eastwood’s Carmel Film and Arts Film Festival. In 2016.

On the Television side, Macneill directed two episodes for HBO’s Emmy winning series, Westworld, along with Amazon Prime Series Them which was nominated for an Independent Spirit Award. Macneill is currently developing an original series, titled UNKNOWN, for Amazon Prime with Jonathan Nolan and Lisa Joy’s Kilter Films producing. Macneill's other TV directorial work include episodes for Jordan Peele's Twilight Zone, Castle Rock, NOS4A2, Monsterland, and the first season of the limited anthology television series Channel Zero: Candle Cove. The show was created by Nick Antosca and starred Paul Schneider and Fiona Shaw.

Early life and education 
Macneill was born in New England, and moved to Northern Virginia where he attended high school.  He graduated from the University of Colorado with a Bachelor of Fine Arts after having studied under filmmakers including Stan Brakhage.

Career

Feature films 
Macneill directed Lizzie, a psychological thriller starring Chloe Sevigny and Kristen Stewart.  Lizzie is premiering in the U.S Dramatic Competition section at the 2018 Sundance Film Festival.

Macneill directed and co-wrote the 2015 feature film The Boy, starring David Morse, Rainn Wilson, Jared Breeze, Mike Vogel, Bill Sage, Zuleikha Robinson, and Aiden Lovecamp. The film was produced by Elijah Wood, Daniel Noah, and Josh C. Waller and the company SpectreVision.

Television 

Macneill directed 2 episodes for HBO's Westworld.

Macneill directed 2 episodes for the first season of Amazon Prime's Them.

Macneill directed an episode for Jordan Peele's The Twilight Zone anthology reboot television series, titled The Blue Scorpion, starring Chris O'Dowd.
 
Macneill directed the first season of the limited anthology television series Channel Zero: Candle Cove. The show was created by Nick Antosca and stars Paul Schneider and Fiona Shaw.

Macneill directed an episode of the horror drama series, Castle Rock.

Macneill directed 2 episodes of the horror drama series, NOS4A2.

Macneill directed 1 episode of the horror drama series, Monsterland.

Macneill directed 2 episodes for the Chilling Adventures of Sabrina.

Short films 
Macneill has written, produced, edited, and directed a number of short films before The Boy. Among them is a 2011 short Henley, which won a "Best Short Film" award at the 2011 Gen Art Film Festival Film Festival and the 2012 Carmel Film and Arts Film Festival.  Henley was one of 64 short films selected from 7,675 submissions to screen in competition at the 2012 Sundance Film Festival.

Among the short films that Macneill has both directed, produced, co-wrote, and edited include the award winning short film Late Bloomer, which screened as an official selection at the 2005 Sundance Film Festival. It won the audience award at the 2004 Lake Placid Film Festival, and was screened at film festivals worldwide

Experimental film 
In 2009, Macneill, along with co-director Alexei Kaleina, completed an experimental film titled The Afterlight, which had its world premiere at the International Rome Film Festival and was acquired for limited theatrical distribution through Cinema Purgatorio. The film stars Michael Kelly, Ana Asensio, Jicky Schnee, and Rip Torn.

Personal life 
Macneill lives in New York City, New York with his wife, director/actress Ana Asensio. He was the recipient of a 2009 Jerome Foundation Grant.

References

External links 
 

American film directors
People from Virginia
University of Colorado alumni
Living people
Year of birth missing (living people)